Germain Chardin (born 15 May 1983 in Verdun) is a French rower. He competed at the 2008 Summer Olympics, where he won a bronze medal in Coxless four. He also competed at the 2010 World Rowing Championships, where he won a gold medal in Coxless four.  At the 2012 Summer Olympics, he won silver medal in the men's pair with Dorian Mortelette.

References 

 

Living people
1983 births
French male rowers
Olympic silver medalists for France
Olympic bronze medalists for France
Olympic rowers of France
Rowers at the 2008 Summer Olympics
Rowers at the 2012 Summer Olympics
Rowers at the 2016 Summer Olympics
Olympic medalists in rowing
Medalists at the 2012 Summer Olympics
Medalists at the 2008 Summer Olympics
People from Verdun
World Rowing Championships medalists for France
Sportspeople from Meuse (department)
European Rowing Championships medalists
21st-century French people